Mandi Shah Jeewna is a town in the Jhang District, Punjab, Pakistan, about 33 km north of Jhang. It is near Shah Jeewna and has a railway station and its own markets. It is also an area of rice and wheat production. Former interior minister Syed Faisal Saleh Hayat is from this town.

Jhang District
Populated places in Jhang District